Frederick Pope Stamper (20 November 1877 – 12 November 1950), usually credited as F. Pope Stamper or F. Pope-Stamper, less often as Pope Stamper, was an English stage and film actor who appeared mostly in Edwardian musical comedy.

Born at Hammersmith in 1877, Stamper was a stage actor both before and after entering the world of silent movies. He had little screen work after the arrival of the "talkies".

In 1902, at Lambeth, he married Daisy Leahy, an Irish chorus girl and actress who used the stage name of Daisy Le Hay.

In 1907 he opened in the musical comedy Miss Hook of Holland at the Prince of Wales Theatre, playing the Bandmaster, and enjoyed a run of 462 performances. In 1911 he appeared in a Charles Frohman production of The Siren at the Knickerbocker Theatre on Broadway, and the same year he played Captain Charteris in A Quiet Girl, at New York's Park Theatre, with a run of 240 performances.

Stamper was a good golfer, but while in New York with a leading role in the Broadway production of The Dollar Princess, he played a round of golf with a Miss Melrose at the Dunwoodie Country Club, in Yonkers, New York, injured the lady by slicing a drive, and faced a claim which was reported as a notable case on the law of torts.

Stamper had a brother, Charles William Stamper, who was motor engineer to King Edward VII, and a son, Henry Lionel Pope Stamper (1906–1985), who enraged his father by abandoning a job his father had got for him in the City of London to become an unsuccessful repertory actor. His granddaughter Rosemary Stamper is the mother of the comedian Jack Dee.

Selected films
The Girl from the Sky (1914): Harold Teale (as Pope Stamper)
Ghosts (1914): The Man (as Pope Stamper)
The Divine Gift (1918): Tristan
The Lackey and the Lady (1919): Garrett Woodruffe
Inheritance (1920): Walter Clifford
The Pride of the Fancy (1920): Oswald Gordon
A Master of Craft (1922): Mate
The Musical Beauty Shop (short film, 1930): John
The Stickpin (short film, 1933): Simms

Notes

External links

1877 births
1950 deaths
English male stage actors
English male film actors
English male silent film actors
People from Hammersmith
19th-century English male actors
20th-century English male actors